Kristina Shikerova is a retired Bulgarian rhythmic gymnast.

Career 
Shikerova's most outstanding international competition was the 1991 World Championship in Piraeus, where she won the silver medal in the rope final and another silver medal in the team competition, along with her compatriots Mila Marinova and Maria Petrova. She was also fourth in the individual All-Around and also in the hoop final.

Shikerova was also a member of the Bulgarian ensemble that won two silver medals, in the All-Around and in six ropes, as well as a gold medal in four hoops and two pairs of clubs, at the 1993 Bucharest European Championships.

References 

Bulgarian rhythmic gymnasts
Living people
Year of birth missing (living people)